The 1991 Grand Prix de Tennis de Lyon was a men's tennis tournament played on indoor carpet courts at the Palais des Sports de Gerland in Lyon, France, and was part of the World Series of the 1991 ATP Tour. It was the fifth edition of the tournament and was held from 14 October through 21 October 1991. Second-seeded Pete Sampras won the singles title.

Finals

Singles

 Pete Sampras defeated  Olivier Delaître 6–1, 6–1
 It was Sampras' 3rd title of the year and the 7th of his career.

Doubles

 Tom Nijssen /  Cyril Suk defeated  Steve DeVries /  David Macpherson 7–6, 6–3
 It was Nijssen's 2nd title of the year and the 6th of his career. It was Suk's 3rd title of the year and the 4th of his career.

References

External links
 ITF tournament edition details

Grand Prix de Tennis de Lyon
1991
Grand Prix de Tennis de Lyon